Akoupé Department is a department of La Mé Region in Lagunes District, Ivory Coast. In 2021, its population was 156,698 and its seat is the settlement of Akoupé. The sub-prefectures of the department are Afféry, Akoupé, and Bécouéfin.

History
Akoupé Department was created in 2005 as a second-level subdivision via a split-off from Adzopé Department. At its creation, it was part of Agnéby Region.

In 2011, districts were introduced as new first-level subdivisions of Ivory Coast. At the same time, regions were reorganised and became second-level subdivisions and all departments were converted into third-level subdivisions. At this time, Akoupé Department became part of La Mé Region in Lagunes District.

Notes

Departments of La Mé
2005 establishments in Ivory Coast
States and territories established in 2005